Gaulier  is a surname. Notable people with the surname include:

People

 Alfred Gaulier (1829–1898), French politician
 Géraldine Gaulier (born 1947), Swiss singer
 Philippe Gaulier (born 1943), French clown and professor

Other

 Gaulier River, a river in the parish of St. John, Grenada